Partizansky District is an administrative and municipal district (raion), one of the forty-three in Krasnoyarsk Krai, Russia. Its administrative center is the rural locality (a selo) of Partizanskoye. Population:  12,437 (2002 Census);  The population of Partizanskoye accounts for 34.4% of the district's total population.

History
The district was founded on April 4, 1924.

Government
As of 2013, the Head of the District is Alexander A. Zemurbeys and the Chairman of the District Council is Alexander V. Kudryavtsev.

References

Notes

Sources

Districts of Krasnoyarsk Krai
States and territories established in 1924